The Bell 214 is a medium-lift helicopter derived from Bell Helicopter's ubiquitous UH-1 Huey series. The Bell 214ST shares the same model number, but is a larger, much-modified twin-engine derivative.

Design and development

The original development of the Model 214 was announced by Bell in 1970 under the name "Huey Plus". The first prototype was based on a Bell 205 airframe equipped with a Lycoming T53-L-702 engine of 1,900 shp.

The first Bell 214A demonstration prototype followed and was evaluated in Iran during field exercises with the Imperial Iranian Armed Forces. The trial was judged successful and an order for 287 214A helicopters followed. The intention was that these aircraft would be constructed by Bell in their Dallas-Fort Worth facility and that a further 50 214As and 350 Bell 214ST helicopters would then be built in Iran. In the event, 296 214A and 39 214C variants were delivered, before the Iranian Revolution in 1979 ended the plans for Iranian production.

Similar in size and appearance to the Bell 205 and Bell 212, the Bell 214 uses a single, more powerful Lycoming LTC4B-8 engine (2,930 shp; 2,185 kW) and upgraded rotor system, giving it a high lifting capacity and good performance at high temperatures and high altitudes. It can be identified by the single large exhaust duct and wide chord rotor blades without stabilizer bars.

Bell offered the Bell 214B "BigLifter" for civil use. It received certification in 1976.  The 214B was produced until 1981. Powered by a 2,930 shp (2,183 kW) Lycoming T5508D turboshaft, it has the same rotor drive and transmission system as the 214A. The transmission is rated at 2,050 shp (1,528 kW) for take-off, with a maximum continuous power rating of 1,850 shp (1,379 kW). The BigLifter features advanced rotor hub with elastomeric bearings; an automatic flight control system with stability augmentation; and commercial avionics.

Operational history
As of January 2012, 29 Bell 214s were in military service, including 25 Bell 214As with Iran, and three 214Bs with United Arab Emirates.

Approximately 41 Bell 214Bs are in commercial service.  User countries are Australia (6), Canada (10), Singapore (3) and United States (15).

Variants

 Bell 214 Huey Plus - The prototype 214 flew in 1970. Powered by one Lycoming T53-L-702 turboshaft (1,900 shp/1,415 kW).
 Bell 214A/C Isfahan - The 299 Bell 214As for the Imperial Iranian Army Aviation were built beginning in 1972, followed by 39 Bell 214Cs with a hoist (winch) and other search and rescue equipment for the Imperial Iranian Air Force.

 Bell 214B BigLifter - Civil variant of the 214A. 70 built.
 Bell 214B-1 - This variant of the Bell Model 214B is limited to a maximum 12,500 lb (5,670 kg) gross weight with an internal load due to different certification standards. The external load is the same as the 214B.  The only difference between the 214B and 214B-1 is the dataplate, and flight manual.

Operators

Department of Fire and Emergency Services

Islamic Republic of Iran Army Aviation

Former operators

Ecuadorian Army

National Disaster Management Authority - Rented from McDermott Aviation.

 Royal Air Force of Oman

United Arab Emirates Air Force

Specifications (214A)

See also

References

External links

1970s United States civil utility aircraft
Single-turbine helicopters
Aircraft first flown in 1970
214